Eusebius Andrews may refer to:

 William Eusebius Andrews (1773–1837), English journalist and editor
Eusebius Andrews (Royalist) (died 1650), English royalist